Filipe Santos Oliveira (born 21 April 1994) is a Portuguese professional footballer who plays for Vitória F.C. as a midfielder.

Club career

União Leiria
Born in Leiria, Oliveira joined local U.D. Leiria's youth ranks in 2007, aged 13. On 21 April 2012 he made his first-team (and Primeira Liga) debut, playing 15 minutes in a 3–2 away loss against Vitória de Guimarães on his 18th birthday. The following weekend, he was one of only eight players fielded – the club was immerse in a deep financial crisis – in a 0–4 home defeat to C.D. Feirense.

Oliveira was invited to a trial period with AFC Ajax in late May 2012. The Dutch side were impressed with his performance at the Copa Amsterdam where he was part of the under-19 squad, and subsequently invited him to a formal tryout, releasing him at its closure.

Benfica
Oliveira signed with S.L. Benfica in summer 2012. He spent one season with the juniors, winning the national championship.

Additionally, Oliveira had five bench appearances for the B team in the Segunda Liga, failing to receive any playing time.

Marítimo
On 24 July 2013, Oliveira moved to C.S. Marítimo B also in the second division. He scored two goals in 31 games in the 2014–15 campaign, suffering relegation.

Oliveira made his official debut for the first team on 20 August 2017, featuring the full 90 minutes in a 1–0 league home win over Boavista FC. He scored his first goal in the competition for them the following 3 January, but in a 1–2 loss against G.D. Chaves also at the Estádio do Marítimo.

Famalicão
In July 2018, Oliveira signed a two-year deal at F.C. Famalicão of the second tier. He played mainly from the bench in his first season, in which they achieved promotion as runners-up after a quarter-century outside the top flight.

References

External links

National team data 

1994 births
Living people
People from Leiria
Sportspeople from Leiria District
Portuguese footballers
Association football midfielders
Primeira Liga players
Liga Portugal 2 players
Campeonato de Portugal (league) players
U.D. Leiria players
S.L. Benfica B players
C.S. Marítimo players
F.C. Famalicão players
U.D. Vilafranquense players
Vitória F.C. players
I liga players
Korona Kielce players
Portugal youth international footballers
Portuguese expatriate footballers
Expatriate footballers in Poland
Portuguese expatriate sportspeople in Poland